José Moisela (born June 25, 1980 in Lima, Peru) is a Peruvian footballer who plays as a left back. He currently plays for Inti Gas Deportes in the Peruvian First Division .

Career
Moisela has played most of his career in Peru for a selection of different clubs. In 2006, he had a short spell in Argentina with Belgrano, but he only played three games for the club before returning to Peru.

References

External links
 
 

1980 births
Living people
Footballers from Lima
Peruvian footballers
Peru international footballers
Peruvian Primera División players
Deportivo Municipal footballers
Sport Coopsol Trujillo footballers
Sporting Cristal footballers
Club Deportivo Universidad de San Martín de Porres players
Club Universitario de Deportes footballers
Club Atlético Belgrano footballers
Alianza Atlético footballers
Juan Aurich footballers
Club Alianza Lima footballers
Total Chalaco footballers
Ayacucho FC footballers
Peruvian expatriate footballers
Expatriate footballers in Argentina
Association football fullbacks